The PODO Museum is a private art museum and cultural complex on Jeju Island, in South Korea. The name PODO means "grape" in Korean and the museum neighbors PODO Hotel, which was designed by Korean-Japanese architect Jun Itami.

History 

The PODO Museum was inaugurated on April 24, 2021 under the directorship of Chloe H Kim. The building was designed in 2011 by the late architect Kim Seok Chul (1943-2016), who also designed the Korean pavilion in the Giardini of the Venice Biennale with Venetian architect Franco Mancuso.

Exhibitions 

Exhibitions at the PODO Museum are on an annual basis. 

· The World We Made (April 24, 2021 - May 23, 2022) showcased the works of the following artists: Airan Kang, Zhang Xiaogang, Yongbaek Lee, Kijong Zin, Ryota Kuwakubo, Yongju Kwon, Seonglib, Sujin Choi. This exhibition was also available on Naver's metaverse platform Zepeto and its 13 artworks were up for auction on Featured by Binance (August 8-15, 2021)

· It is Spring, My Son (April 24, 2021 - May 23, 2022) was a solo exhibition of German Expressionist Käthe Schmidt Kollwitz.

· Yet, With Love (July 5, 2022 - July 3, 2023) showcases the works of the following artists: Beikyoung Lee, Dongju Kang, Yeondoo Jung, Yoko Ono, Reena Kallat, Ugo Rondinone, Alfredo & Isabel AQUILIZAN

References 

Museums in South Korea